The 2000 Rhode Island Rams football team was an American football team that represented the University of Rhode Island in the Atlantic 10 Conference during the 2000 NCAA Division I-AA football season. In their first season under head coach Tim Stowers, the Rams compiled a 3–8 record (2–7 against conference opponents) and finished ninth out of ten teams in the conference.

Schedule

References

Rhode Island
Rhode Island Rams football seasons
Rhode Island Rams football